Mahamoudou Kéré (born 2 January 1982) is a Burkinabé former professional footballer who played as a centre back.

Career
Kéré was born in Ouagadougou. On 9 June 2010, he left Charleroi SC to join Turkish side Konyaspor on a 3-year contract.

International career
Kéré was a member of the Burkinabé 2004 African Nations Cup team, who finished bottom of their group in the first round of competition, thus failing to secure qualification for the quarter-finals.

Career statistics

International goals

References

External links

1982 births
Burkinabé footballers
Burkinabé expatriate footballers
Burkina Faso international footballers
2000 African Cup of Nations players
2004 African Cup of Nations players
2010 Africa Cup of Nations players
2012 Africa Cup of Nations players
Sportspeople from Ouagadougou
Association football central defenders
Living people
R. Charleroi S.C. players
Belgian Pro League players
Expatriate footballers in Belgium
Santos FC Ouagadougou footballers
Konyaspor footballers
Süper Lig players
R.W.D.M. Brussels F.C. players
Challenger Pro League players
Expatriate footballers in Turkey
Burkinabé expatriate sportspeople in Turkey
21st-century Burkinabé people